John Kiran Fernandes (born November 21, 1975) is an American multi-instrumentalist musician.

Professional career
Fernandes, along with several other members of the Elephant Six Collective, joined the acclaimed psychedelic pop group The Olivia Tremor Control in Athens, GA in 1994. Fernandes was also a member of the side-project Black Swan Network.

Upon that band's demise, Fernandes went on to form the Athens-based group Circulatory System with other members of Olivia Tremor Control, most notably Will Cullen Hart.

In addition, Hart and Fernandes started a record label in 2001 called Cloud Recordings, which issued the Circulatory System's self-titled first album. Fernandes frequently contributes to multiple Athens-based bands' live shows and recordings. He currently plays with Circulatory System, The New Sound of Numbers, Old Smokey, Freehand, Lavender Holyfield, Jacob Morris - Moths, and Dream Boat. All of these groups have recordings available. He has also recently been performing his own live solo shows, and has performed as part of the Elephant 6 Collective's occasional tours.

He released an album of solo material in February 2011 under the name John Kiran Fernandes.
He released a second album of solo material in November 2015, also under the name John Kiran Fernandes.

Fernandes works at Wuxtry Records in Athens, where one of his co-workers was Danger Mouse.

Discography 

 The Olivia Tremor Control - The Giant Day seven-inch (1996)
 The Olivia Tremor Control - Music from the Unrealized Film Script: Dusk at Cubist Castle CD/2LP (1996)
 The Olivia Tremor Control - The Opera House 2CD/2 seven-inch (1996)
 Black Swan Network - Late Music Volume One CD (1997)
 The Olivia Tremor Control/Black Swan Network CD/LP (1997)
 of Montreal - The Bird Who Ate The Rabbit's Flower CD/LP (1997)
 Elf Power - When The Red King Comes CD (1997)
 The Olivia Tremor Control - Jumping Fences CD/twelve-inch (1998)
 The Olivia Tremor Control - Hideaway CD/twelve-inch (1998)
 of Montreal - The Bedside Drama: A Petite Tragedy CD/LP (1998)
 The Olivia Tremor Control - Black Foliage: Animation Music Volume One CD/2LP (1999)
 of Montreal - Gay Parade CD/LP (1999)
 Calvin, Don't Jump! - Solamente La Luna Esta Noche seven-inch (1999)
 Sunshine Fix - Beaconary Word seven-inch (1999)
 The Olivia Tremor Control - John Peel Session CD/LP (2000)
 The Olivia Tremor Control/Kahimi Karie - Once Upon A Time CD (2000)
 Black Swan Network seven-inch (2001)
 Circulatory System - Circulatory System CD/2LP (2001)
 Circulatory System - Inside Views CDr (2001)
 Pipes You See, Pipes You Don't. - Individualized Shirts CD (2001)
 Major Organ and the Adding Machine CD/LP (2001)
 A Hawk and A Hacksaw - A Hawk and A Hacksaw CD/LP (2002)
 The Instruments - Billions of Phonographs CD (2003)
 Elf Power - Back To The Web CD/LP (2006)
 The Instruments - Cast Half A Shadow CD (2006)
 The New Sound of Numbers - Liberty Seeds CD (2006)
 The Apples (in stereo) - New Magnetic Wonder CD/LP (2007)
 Folklore - The Ghost Of H.W. Beaverman CD (2007)
 Hope For Agoldensummer - Ariadne Thread CD (2007)
 The Instruments - Dark Småland CD (2008)
 Dark Meat - Universal Indians CD/LP (2008)
 The Music Tapes - Music Tapes for Clouds and Tornadoes CD/LP (2008)
 Paper Tanks - Trigger Happy/Cocoon CDr (2009)
 Circulatory System - Signal Morning CD/LP (2009)
 Dark Meat - Truce Opium CD/LP (2009)
 Madeline - White Flag CD/LP (2009)
 Supercluster - Waves CD (2009)
 Supercluster - I Got the Answer/Sunflower Clock seven-inch (2009)
 Whiskey Sunrise - Rêvenant  CDr (2009)
 Circulatory System - Side Three LP (2010)
 Ham1 - Let's Go On and On and On CD/LP (2010)
 Mouser - Storm Dumps CDr (2010)
 Spirit Hair - Star Don CD (2010)
 Werewolves - Someday We'll Live in the Forest CDr (2010)
 Elf Power - Elf Power CD/LP (2010)
 Supercluster - Paris Effect seven-inch (2011)
 Marshmallow Coast - Seniors and Juniors Strikes Back CD (2011)
 The Elephant Six Orchestra - Welcome To Our Story seven-inch (2011)
 John Kiran Fernandes - John Kiran Fernandes CD (2011)
 Madeline - Black Velvet CD/LP (2011)
 Pipes You See, Pipes You Don't. - Lost in the Pancakes CD (2011)
 The Olivia Tremor Control - "The Game You Play Is In Your Head, Parts 1, 2, & 3" (2011)
 The Music Tapes - Mary's Voice CD/LP (2012)
 Dream Boat - Eclipsing CD/LP (2012)
 Jacob Morris - Moths CD/LP (2012)
 Nesey Gallons - When I Was An Ice Skater CD (2012)
 Old Smokey - Old Smokey EP CDr/seven-inch (2013)
 Elf Power - Sunlight on the Moon CD/LP (2013)
 Jandek - Athens Saturday 2CD/DVD (2013)
 The New Sound of Numbers - Invisible Magnetic LP (2013)
 Old Smokey - Wester Easter CD/LP (2014)
 Circulatory System - Mosaics Within Mosaics CD/2LP/cassette (2014)
 Dream Boat - The Rose Explodes CD/LP (2014)
 Hand Sand Hands - The Shipping Forecast cassette (2014)
 Cult of Riggonia - Harry Chanchfield Presents...LP (2014)
 Mind Brains - Mind Brains LP/CD (2014)
 El Hollín - Una Tuesday cassette (2015)
 The Electric Nature - Alienation cassette (2015)
 Jo RB Jones - Jo RB Jones cassette (2015)
 Alec Livaditis - Clear and Cloud LP (2015)
 John Kiran Fernandes - II cassette (2015)
 Dave Marr - We Were All In Love CD (2016)
 The Taxicab Verses/Kofi Atentenben and the Warriors - Is What You Make It CD (2016)
 Jeff Tobias - Some cassette (2016)
 John Kiran Fernandes - Warm (2016)
 Muuy Biien - Age of Uncertainty LP/CD (2016)
 Lavender Holyfield - Rabbitboxing Midnightmouth LP (2017)
 Philipp Bückle - They Never Got The Message cassette (2017)
 Faust - Fresh Air LP/CD/seven-inch (2017)
 Cindy Wilson - Change CD/LP (2017)
 Bed Rugs - Hard Fun Grand Design 2LP/CD/cassette (2018)
 Old Smokey - Sundowners (2019)
 John Kiran Fernandes - Live at Ciné, June 22, 2019 (2019)
 Sleepy Co. - Kind of Warm For a Lonesome Home (2020)
 Rambutan - Parallel Systems 2CD (2021)
 The Rishis - "Wake Up" (2021)
 Scotty Lingelbach - Cow Tools (2022)
 The Rishis - August Moon (2022)
 John Kiran Fernandes & Shane Parish - Improvisations on Clarinets and Steel-String Guitar (2022)
 Shane Parish - "Walk Back Words" (2023)

References

The Elephant 6 Recording Company artists
Sir Jamsetjee Jeejebhoy School of Art alumni
Living people
Place of birth missing (living people)
The Olivia Tremor Control members
1975 births